Hyper Lode Runner is a video game for the Game Boy from Bandai released in 1989 in Japan and  1990 in North America. It is based on the 1983 game Lode Runner from Broderbund. While each level in the original fit on a single screen, Hyper Lode Runner has a scrolling playfield.

External links
The Lode Runner Museum

1989 video games
Bandai games
Game Boy games
Game Boy-only games
Platform games
Video games developed in Japan
Video game sequels